Jędrychowo  is a village in the administrative district of Gmina Kisielice, within Iława County, Warmian-Masurian Voivodeship, in northern Poland.

References

Villages in Iława County